Mugilogobius adeia is a species of goby endemic to Lake Matano on the Indonesian island of Sulawesi where it inhabits areas with a number of shells of the gastropod Tylomelania gemmifera in which it seeks shelter.  This species can reach a length of  TL.

References

adeia
Freshwater fish of Sulawesi
Fish described in 1992
Taxa named by Helen K. Larson
Taxa named by Maurice Kottelat
Taxonomy articles created by Polbot